Reset Generation (formerly known under the code name Project White Rock) is a cross-platform action-puzzle video game by RedLynx for Windows and N-Gage 2.0 compatible devices. Soundtrack for the game was composed by 8 Bit Weapon. The Windows version of the game is available free whereas the N-Gage version costs £8/€10 for the full game - with limited-time licenses available at lower prices and a free trial version. The game was developed - in part - by Ben 'Yahtzee' Croshaw, a well known author and game critic.

The single-player PC version of the game was made available to FilePlanet subscribers on July 25, 2008 in the form of a browser game. It was made available to non-subscribers on August 1, 2008. The full N-Gage and Windows version of the game with included online capability was released on August 4, 2008.

Features 

Reset Generation includes ten archetypal characters easily recognizable by older players who grew up with the NES and Mega Drive/Genesis, with some of the more easily recognizable characters being a hedgehog, plumber, monster trainer and a level 50 elf. Apart from having 4-player matches, the game also offers an 18 mission-based single-player campaign.

The gameplay has the player try to "rescue" a princess, which is being held in the castle(s) of your opponent(s). Each player must try and breach another player's castle and then return the princess home to their own. Succeeding in rescuing (or capturing, rather) another player's princess eliminates him or her from the game. Players can pick up different items like springs, teleports, BFGPs and Monster Boxes or use the hero's special power to accomplish this target.

The computer version of the game is a browser game that can be played through the Reset Generation official website or it can be embedded onto any other website with the provided source code. Reportedly however only Internet Explorer and Mozilla Firefox are compatible.

Both the N-Gage and PC version of the game are mutually compatible, thus players of the N-Gage and PC versions of the game can play each other in multiplayer mode.

References

External links 
 RedLynx website
 Soundtrack of the game available for download

2008 video games
Europe-exclusive video games
N-Gage service games
Puzzle video games
Strategy video games
Video games developed in Finland
Windows games
RedLynx games
Multiplayer and single-player video games
Nokia games